Matthew of Edessa (late 11th century – 1144) was an Armenian historian in the 12th century from the city of Edessa. Matthew was the superior abbot of Karmir Vank' (Red Convent), near the town of Kaysun, east of Marash (Germanicia), the former seat of Baldwin of Boulogne. He relates much about the Bagratuni Kingdom of Armenia, the early Crusades, and the battles between Byzantines and Arabs for the possession of parts of northern Syria and eastern Asia Minor. Byzantine authors such as Joannes Zonaras and Anna Comnena were well versed in their particular spheres, but uninformed regarding Edessa and neighboring lands which are treated by Matthew.

Biography
A man of strong convictions, Matthew was born in Edessa sometime in the second half of the 11th century and was a member of the Armenian Apostolic Church. He was a determined opponent of the Greek church as well as the Latin church. Matthew was especially bitter against Frankish settlers, whose avaricious and imperious rule and ingratitude he condemns in his work. He was probably slain during the siege of Edessa by Zengi, atabeg of Mosul in 1144.

Chronicle
Matthew's work, Zhamanakagrutyun, or Chronicle, which he probably began writing in 1113 and completed before 1140, is written in a dialect of Western Armenian and is rather chronological, covering two centuries starting in the second half of the tenth and continued by Gregory the Priest through the second half of the twelfth. In an article published in 1971 by Armenian academician Levon Khachikyan, the author established that one of the sources Matthew used to write his work was an 11th-century vardapet named Hakob of Sanahin.

He remains the only primary source of certain information about the political and ecclesiastical events of his time and area. The literary and historical knowledge of Matthew was limited, and some of his chronological data is disputed by modern scholars. Matthew was also a fervent Armenian patriot, lamenting the martyrdom of his people and exalting their heroic deeds. To him, scholars and readers are indebted for the record of two documents of importance — a letter from the Byzantine Emperor John I Tzimisces, to Bagratuni king Ashot III and a discourse delivered in the cathedral of Hagia Sophia, Constantinople, in the presence of the Emperor Constantine X Ducas by Gagik II, the exiled Bagratuni king, concerning the doctrinal divergence between the Greek and Armenian churches.

According to some scholars, Matthew was intolerant towards both Greeks and Latins, as well as unsympathetic towards Syrians, judging by allusions made by Abul-Faraj at a later date.

Translations
Chronique de Mathieu d'Édesse (962-1136), continuée par Grégoire le prêtre, French translation from 1858
 Armenia and the Crusades: Tenth to Twelfth Centuries: The Chronicle of Matthew of Edessa, translated from the original Armenian with a commentary and introduction by Ara Edmond Dostourian. Belmont, MA: National Association for Armenian Studies and Research, 1993.

Notes

Further reading
MacEvitt, Christopher. The Crusades and the Christian World of the East: Rough Tolerance. Philadelphia: University of Pennsylvania Press, 2008.

External links
 Mattʿēos Uṙhayecʿi and His Chronicle: History as Apocalypse in a Crossroads of Cultures / Tara L. Andrews. — BRILL, 2016.

Medieval writers about the Crusades
12th-century Armenian  historians
1144 deaths
Year of birth unknown